Lucia Travaini (born 1953) is an Italian numismatist, archaeologist, and academic. She is Associate Professor of Medieval and Modern Numismatics at the University of Milan.

Life
Travaini studied archaeology at the Sapienza University of Rome. She worked for the Soprintendenza Archeologica, the Ministry of Cultural Heritage, and at the National Roman Museum. From 1992 to 1998, she was a senior research associate to Philip Grierson at the  Fitzwilliam Museum, University of Cambridge. In 1998, she returned to Italy to join the University of Milan. She also taught at her alma mater between 2002 and 2005.

Honours
In 2012, Travaini was awarded the Medal of the Royal Numismatic Society, one of the highest awards for numismatists. In 2014, she was awarded the Prix Duchalais by the Académie des Inscriptions et Belles-Lettres for her book Le zecche italiane fino all'Unità (published 2011). In 2016, she was elected an honorary member of the Royal Numismatic Society of Belgium.

Selected works

References

External links
 

1953 births
Living people
Italian numismatists
Archaeologists from Milan
Italian women archaeologists
Sapienza University of Rome alumni
Curators from Milan
People associated with the Fitzwilliam Museum
Academic staff of the University of Milan
Academic staff of the Sapienza University of Rome
Women numismatists
Italian curators
20th-century archaeologists
21st-century archaeologists
Italian women curators